François Loeser (born August 25, 1958) is a French mathematician. He is Professor of Mathematics at the Pierre-and-Marie-Curie University in Paris. From 2000 to 2010 he was Professor at École Normale Supérieure. Since 2015, he is a senior member of the Institut Universitaire de France.

He was awarded the CNRS Silver Medal in 2011 and the Charles-Louis de Saulces de Freycinet Prize of the French Academy of Sciences in 2007. He was awarded an ERC Advanced Investigator Grant in 2010 and has been a Plenary Speaker at the European Congress of Mathematics in Amsterdam in 2008. In 2014 Loeser was an Invited Speaker at the International Congresses of Mathematicians in Seoul. In 2015 he was elected as a fellow of the American Mathematical Society "for contributions to algebraic and arithmetic geometry and to model theory".
He was elected member of Academia Europaea in 2019.

References

Publications

External links 

 Loeser's  home page

1958 births
Living people
Scientists from Mulhouse
20th-century French mathematicians
21st-century French mathematicians
École Normale Supérieure alumni
Fellows of the American Mathematical Society
Academic staff of Pierre and Marie Curie University
Model theorists